André Harvey may refer to:
 André Harvey (MP) (born 1941), Canadian member of the House of Commons of Canada
 André Harvey (MNA) (born 1939), Canadian member of the National Assembly of Quebec
 André Harvey (sculptor) (1941–2018), American sculptor